Sangrani is a small village of Naraingarh Tehsil, Ambala district, in the state of Haryana, India. It is situated in the foothills of the Shiwalik mountain range and on the bank of Arun River which pours along with Markanda River which is a spiritual and holy river for the local mass.

Sangrani has a population of only 950 people.

Education
The village has a middle school with a great number of student from neighboring villages.

Location
The village is situated 3 km north-east from its main town Naraingarh.

Transportation
The village is well connected with good roads, and is only 3 km from the bus stand of Naraingarh.

See also
Harbon

Villages in Ambala district